Gummel may refer to:

In people:
 Margitta Gummel (1941–2021), an athlete from East Germany
 Hermann Gummel (1923–2022), a German-born physicist and pioneer in semiconductor industry

In other uses:
 Gumel, or Gummel, a town and traditional emirate in Jigawa State, Nigeria
 Gummel–Poon model, a model of the bipolar junction transistor
 Gummel plot, transistor plot